Harvey Thomas Dunn NA (March 8, 1884 – October 29, 1952) was an American painter and teacher. He is best known for his prairie-intimate masterpiece, The Prairie is My Garden (1950). In this painting, a mother and her two children are out gathering flowers from the quintessential prairie of the Great Plains.

Early life
Dunn was born on a homestead farm near Manchester, South Dakota, in the county made famous by Laura Ingalls Wilder's descriptions of prairie life.  The young man’s talent was first recognized by Ada Caldwell, an art instructor at South Dakota Agricultural College (now South Dakota State University), which Dunn attended in 1901-1902.  Urged by Caldwell, Dunn pursued his artistic studies in Wilmington, Delaware, under the instruction of Howard Pyle. Dunn was one of a small group of Pyle's defining students who were to revolutionize the illustration world and today are collectively known as the Brandywine School. There he also met William James Aylward and Ernest Peixotto, artists that would later accompany him in the United States Army American Expeditionary Force.

Career
In 1906, after two years with Pyle, Dunn established his own studio in Wilmington and immediately began a successful career in illustration.  He was a prodigious painter, able to produce (on one occasion) fifty-five completed paintings in eleven weeks for various clients.  A contemporary described his style in these terms, “He literally attacked a canvas and sometimes I thought he would impale the painting with his brush.” In addition to his illustrations for books, Dunn’s work by then was appearing regularly in such magazines as Collier's Weekly, Harper's Magazine, The Saturday Evening Post, and Scribner's.

In 1914, Dunn moved east and settled in Leonia, New Jersey, across the Hudson River from New York City and its publishing world.  Inspired by Pyle's example, Dunn opened the Leonia School of Illustration in 1915 with artist Charles S. Chapman.

His experiences at the front as one of eight artist-correspondents with the American Expeditionary Force in Europe was a turning point for the artist.  Dunn’s interest in commercial illustration declined on his return to the United States.  Instead, the artist envisioned working for several years for the National War College committing to canvas his sketches of the battlefields of Europe. Unfortunately, demobilization occurred at a rapid pace, and Dunn’s project was rejected.  It became the big heartbreak of his life.  However, Dunn was able to salvage part of his ambitious plan; in 1927, he began to paint covers with military themes for The American Legion Monthly magazine.  The majority of Dunn’s war sketches are now housed at the Smithsonian Institution in the National Museum of American History in Washington, D.C.

The South Dakota Art Museum in Brookings, South Dakota, houses approximately 140 of Dunn's best works. Most of the works are on loan by people from DeSmet and Manchester, South Dakota, or were gifts of the artist and his family.  His "often seen" painting Dakota Woman, from his series of strong pioneer women, is housed at Dakota Discovery Museum in Mitchell, South Dakota. The Chuckwagon is a 1915 Dunn painting owned by the Denver Art Museum. The Smithsonian Institution notes it is a "quiet scene depicting a small group of cowboys seated on the ground beside a chuckwagon, their backs turned toward the viewer, their horses standing nearby, and a pond in the background."

Later in life Dunn remarked: “The most fruitful and worthwhile thing I have ever done has been to teach.”  Dunn became an influential and revered teacher; students referred to him as “Mr. Dunn” as a sign of respect and admiration.  The majority of Dunn’s students were either graduate level painters or professional illustrators.  Dunn was not interested in teaching painting techniques.  His approach was philosophically oriented—he spoke about spirit, emotions, and discourse at length.  He discussed his philosophy of life and art, offered group criticism, and strode from easel to easel discussing each student’s work in turn.

Dunn’s most inspired teaching was probably achieved at the Grand Central School of Art, which was established by the Grand Central Art Galleries and located on the top floor of Grand Central Terminal in New York City.  His comments were captured by a student during a five-hour class session and were published in 1934 in a slim volume titled An Evening in the Classroom.  Dunn was a demanding teacher and at times a harsh critic.  He believed in preparing his students for the harsh realities and intense competition of the commercial world.  Talent was not enough.  As he once said, “If you ever amount to anything at all, it will be because you are true to that deep desire or ideal which made you seek artistic expression in pictures.” Other students included Dean Cornwell, James E. Allen, Harry Beckhoff, John Clymer, Mac Conner, Dan Content, Mario Cooper, Wilmot Emerton Heitland, Walt S. Louderback, Henry Clarence Pitz, Arthur Sarnoff, Mead Schaeffer, Harold Von Schmidt, Frank Street, and Saul Tepper.

In 1945 Dunn was named a member of the National Academy of Design.  He died in New York at the age of 68 from cancer.  His name is memorialized by Harvey Dunn Elementary School, located in the eastern part of Sioux Falls, South Dakota.

References

External links

 
 
 

1884 births
1952 deaths
20th-century American painters
American male painters
People from Leonia, New Jersey
People from Kingsbury County, South Dakota
Art Students League of New York faculty
Artists from South Dakota
Grand Central School of Art faculty
National Academy of Design members
South Dakota State University alumni
United States Army artists
United States Army personnel of World War I
World War I artists
Painters from New Jersey
20th-century American male artists